Eduardo V. Teixeira is a Brazilian mathematician working in the areas of analysis and partial differential equations. He is a professor at the University of Central Florida. He was awarded the 2017 ICTP Ramanujan Prize for his contributions to mathematics. He obtained his Ph.D. in 2005 under the supervision of Luis Caffarelli at the University of Texas at Austin. He has been a member of the Brazilian Academy of Sciences since 2007.

References 

University of Central Florida faculty
Living people
Year of birth missing (living people)
University of Texas alumni
Members of the Brazilian Academy of Sciences
21st-century Brazilian mathematicians